Izghawa is a district on the border between the two municipalities of Umm Salal and Al Rayyan in Qatar. Consequently, its administration is split, with its western portion (Izghawa 71) being managed by Umm Salal and the east (Izghawa 51) being controlled by Al Rayyan.

Geography
The majority of urban settlement is based in the east, in Izghawa 51, some of which is situated in a rawda (depression). In the western portion, or Izghawa 71, there is a large undeveloped tract of land, some farms and a wadi named Wadi Izghawa Al Gharbi.

Landmarks
One of the settlement's defining landmarks is the Izghawa Park. Occupying an area of over 14,000 square meters, the park was opened in 2006 to provide a green space for residents. In addition to its numerous trees and ornamentals, the parks facilities include a mosque, a children's play area, a volleyball court, and a basketball court. In April 2018, the second-ever branch of The Center for the Empowerment and Care of Older Persons was constructed within the park. The center provides a range of services and facilities to those over 60 years of age.

Transport
Currently, the elevated Izghawa Metro Station is under construction, having been launched during Phase 2A. Once completed, it will be part of Doha Metro's Green Line.

Education
The following schools are located in Izghawa:

References 

Populated places in Umm Salal
Populated places in Al Rayyan